Robert Charles Bates (–unknown, after 1940), was an American architect, educator, and textbook author. He was an African American architect and helped design and build many of the Claflin University campus buildings, a historically black university (HBU) in South Carolina. He is thought to the first Black teacher of architecture at a HBU; and the first African American author of an architecture textbook.

Biography 
Robert Charles Bates was born  in Columbia, South Carolina, where his father was a farmer. It is thought that he took a correspondence course in mechanical drawing (possibly from Scranton Correspondence School in Scranton, Pennsylvania). He attended Clafin University's Normal School to become a teacher, but he was short two years from graduation. 

In a turn of events and despite not graduating, he was appointed as the superintendent of manual training at Claflin University, determined by the Freedmen's Aid Society and the Southern Education Society. By fall of 1890, Bates was teaching architectural drawing at Claflin, and is believed to be the first Black teacher of architecture at a HBU. Two years later he published a textbook based on his class lectures, and despite being poorly written, it may be the first architecture book authored by an African American.

From 1897 until 1900, Bates moved to Upstate New York in order to teach mechanical drawing at Elmira Reformatory. Followed by teaching vocational trade at the Jacob Tome Institution for Black juvenile delinquents and orphans in Port Deposit, Cecil County, Maryland.

Many of the biographical details of Bate's life are unknown, including his circumstances in death. Bates' profile was included in the biographical dictionary African American Architects: A Biographical Dictionary, 1865–1945 (2004).

Publications

Works 
 T. Willard Lewis Chapel (1890) at Claflin University, Orangeburg, South Carolina
 Fisk Building (main building, 1899) the north and south towers at Claflin University, Orangeburg, South Carolina (destroyed by a fire in 1913)
 Fisk Building (main building, 1900) classroom annex at Claflin University, Orangeburg, South Carolina (destroyed by a fire in 1913)
 John F. Slater Manual training building at Claflin University, Orangeburg, South Carolina

See also 
 African-American architects
 Robert Robinson Taylor, another early Black teacher of architecture at a HBU
 William Wilson Cooke, African-American architect also at Claflin

References 

1872 births
People from Columbia, South Carolina
Date of death unknown
Claflin University faculty
African-American architects
American textbook writers